Stèphanie de Montaneis was a mid-13th century physician in Lyons.

The 13th century was a time which proved difficult for any women trying to enter the medical field through a traditional system of education. Some women reached this field only if it was a family business. Stèphanie de Montaneis’ father, Étienne de Montaneis, was a physician in Lyons and it is more than likely that she received her training from him. In 1265 she was referred to by the term medica.

Stèphanie de Montaneis' name is included on the tiles of the Heritage Floor of Judy Chicago's art installation The Dinner Party.

References

13th-century French physicians
13th-century French women
Physicians from Lyon
Medieval women physicians